Pierre Benjamin Daniel Massé (13 January 1898, 16th arrondissement of Paris – 15 December 1987, 16th arrondissement of Paris) was an economist, engineer, applied mathematician, and high official in the French government.

Education and career
After graduation from l'École polytechnique, Massé became an engineer at l'École nationale des ponts et chaussées and a Doctor of Science. From 1928 he worked in the electrical industry and became at Électricité de France in 1946 the director of electrical equipment and operations and in 1948 the deputy general manager. In 1957 he became president of l'Électricité de Strasbourg. In 1959 Charles de Gaulle named him Commissaire général du Plan (General Commissioner of Planning) and he held this position until 1966. Massé was chairman of the board of directors of Électricité de France from 1965 to 1969 and an associate professor of la Faculté de Droit de Paris from 1965 to 1967. He was the first president of the Fondation de France from 1969 to 1973. He was elected a member of l'Académie des sciences morales et politiques in 1977.

Pierre Massé did research in economics on the theories of economic depreciation, dynamic programming, and total factor productivity and in mathematics on Pontryagin's minimum principle. He was an invited speaker at the International Congress of Mathematicians in 1928 at Bologna.

Selected publications
 
 
 
 
 Le Plan, ou l'Anti-hasard (1965; 1991)
 Les Dividendes du progrès (1969)
 La Crise du développement (1973)
 
 Aléas et progrès: entre Candide et Cassandre (1984)

References

External links
 Pierre Massé (1898–1987) – Author – Resources from the BnF

1898 births
1987 deaths
École Polytechnique alumni
Corps des ponts
Engineers from Paris
Civil servants from Paris
French economists
French civil engineers
20th-century French mathematicians
Électricité de France people
Fellows of the Econometric Society